Amazing Love may refer to:

Music

Albums
Amazing Love (Hillsong album), a 2002 album from Hillsong Church 
Amazing Love (Graham Kendrick album), a 1990 Christian live album 
Amazing Love, a 1973 album by Charley Pride
 Amazing Love, a 2005 album by Chris Jasper

Songs
"Amazing Love" (song), a 1973 song by Charley Pride
"Amazing Love", a 2002 song by Hillsong from Amazing Love 
"Amazing Love", a 1990 song  by Graham Kendrick from Amazing Love
"Amazing Love", a 2004 song by  Michelle Williams from Do You Know
"Amazing Love", by Phil Perry
"Amazing Love", a 1959 song by Joe Williams
"You Are My King (Amazing Love)", a 2001 song by Phillips, Craig and Dean; also recorded by Newsboys

Other uses
Amazing Love: The Story of Hosea, a Christian film from Five & Two Pictures